The Central District of Savojbolagh County is in Alborz province, Iran. At the 2006 census, its population was 106,879 in 28,413 households, at which time the county was within Tehran province. At the latest census in 2016, the population had increased to 153,675 in 47,980 households, by which time the county was within Alborz province.

References 

Savojbolagh County

Districts of Alborz Province

Populated places in Alborz Province

Populated places in Savojbolagh County